Kurt Spellmeyer is a Zen teacher and professor in the English Department at Rutgers University.

Zen lineage 
Kurt Spellmeyer, Kankan Roshi, trained with Takabayashi Genki and Kangan Glenn Webb, founders of the Seattle Zen Center. In 1985, Spellmeyer completed his training under Webb Roshi and was authorized to teach. He received the dharma name Kankan (Ch. Guan Han, “Sees the Cold”), at a private ceremony with Webb in 1991.

Kankan Roshi has practiced Zen meditation for 40 years. He has directed the Cold Mountain Sangha since 1994. The Cold Mountain (Kanzan) lineage of Rinzai Zen can be traced back to the Han Shan Temple in Suzhou, China.

Teaching 
From 1985 until 2021, Spellmeyer served as Director of the School of Arts and Sciences Writing Program. The Writing Program at Rutgers, which offers courses at all levels from developmental writing to advanced writing for the sciences and the professions, currently serves 17,000 each year and employs roughly 250 faculty.

Writing 

Spellmeyer is the author of Buddha at the Apocalypse: Awakening from a Culture of Destruction (Wisdom Publications, 2010), Arts of Living: Reinventing the Humanities for the Twenty-first Century (SUNY Press, 2003), The New Humanities Reader (Houghton-Mifflin, 2002), Common Ground: Dialogue, Understanding, and the Teaching of Composition (Prentice Hall, 1992).  

In Arts of Living, Spellmeyer asks readers to separate the explicit content of academic knowledge from the way that this knowledge helps perpetuate enduring forms of structural inequality.  He is critical of both conservative elitists like Allan Bloom and self-professed "leftists" who claim an oppositional status while reinforcing class distinctions of the kind described by Pierre Bourdieu. Although Spellmeyer's research has been influenced by sociologists like Bourdieu, Charles Derber, and others, he is particularly indebted to Barbara and John Ehrenreich's work on the rise of "new class"—the professional-managerial elite, including academics, who have become the core of the Democratic Party in the U.S., displacing a working-class constituency. In a review of Arts of Living, one critic said:

Spellmeyer has also published articles on theories of composition/rhetoric, critical theory, and the sociology of knowledge and of academic institutions, in journals that include College English, College Composition and Communication, The Journal of Advanced Composition, Pedagogy, Transformations, and Religion and the Arts. Spellmeyer is a contributing editor at Tricycle: The Buddhist Review.

Awards 
In 1993 he won the Ross Winterowd Award for his 1992 book Common Ground: Dialogue, Understanding, and the Teaching of Composition.

In 2004, he received Rutgers' Teacher-Scholar Award for outstanding contributions to the scholarship on teaching.

References 

Rutgers University faculty
Living people
American spiritual writers
Engaged Buddhists
Zen Buddhism writers
American Buddhists
American Zen Buddhists
Rinzai Buddhists
American Zen Buddhist spiritual teachers
American academics of English literature
1953 births